A polysulfane is a chemical compound of formula , where n > 1 (although disulfane is sometimes excluded). Polysulfanes consist of unbranched chains of sulfur atoms terminated with hydrogen atoms. Compounds containing 2 – 8 concatenated sulfur atoms have been isolated, longer chain compounds have been detected, but only in solution.  is colourless, higher members are yellow with the colour increasing with the sulfur content. Even a trace of alkali will cause chemical decomposition, and containers need to be treated with acid to remove any traces of alkali. In the chemical literature the term polysulfanes is sometimes used for compounds containing , e.g. organic polysulfanes .

Since sulfur is a chalcogen, polysulfanes can be classed as hydrogen chalcogenides.

Chemistry and properties

where  is cyclo-octasulfur or cyclooctasulfane, one of the allotropes of sulfur.
; ΔH = −ve

Attempting to make a polysulfane by acidifying an alkali metal polysulfide salt (e.g. sodium disulfide) simply produces hydrogen sulfide, and sulfur. Polysulfanes can be made from polysulfides by pouring polysulfide into cooled concentrated hydrochloric acid to produce a mixture of metastable polysulfanes as a yellow oil, from which individual compounds may be separated by fractional distillation. Other more selective syntheses are:

 (n = 4, 5, 6)

The reaction of polysulfanes with sulfur dichloride or disulfur dichloride produces long-chain dichloropolysulfanes:

The reaction with a sulfite salt (a base) quantitatively decomposes the polysulfane to produce thiosulfate and hydrogen sulfide:

References 

Hydrogen compounds